SA's Got Talent was renewed for a fourth season. There were no major changes this season.

Auditions

References

Got Talent
2013 South African television seasons